Theodore Trapplan "Tappan" Michael Wentworth (February 24, 1802 –  June 12, 1875) was a U.S. Representative from Massachusetts.

Biography
Wentworth was born in Dover, New Hampshire, on February 24, 1802.  He received a liberal schooling, and worked as a store clerk in Portsmouth, New Hampshire, and South Berwick, Maine.  He then studied law with William Burleigh, was admitted to the bar in 1826, and commenced practice in York County, Maine.

He moved to Lowell, Massachusetts, in 1833 and continued the practice of law.  Wentworth was a member of the committee which drafted Lowell's city charter, and was a member of the Lowell city council from 1836 to 1841, and was the council president beginning in 1837.  He served in the Massachusetts House of Representatives in 1851, 1859, 1860, 1863, and 1864, and in the Massachusetts State Senate in 1848, 1849, 1865, and 1866.

Wentworth was elected as a Whig to the Thirty-third Congress, defeating Henry Wilson.  He served from March 4, 1853, to March 3, 1855, and was an unsuccessful candidate for reelection in 1854 to the Thirty-fourth Congress.

After leaving Congress, Wentworth returned to practicing law.  He was also active in several business ventures including railroads and banking, and served as president of Rhode Island's National Rubber Company.  He died in Lowell on June 12, 1875, and was interred in Lowell Cemetery.

Family
In 1842 Wentworth married Anne McNeil, a daughter of Solomon McNeil and niece of John McNeil Jr.  John McNeil was married to Elizabeth Pierce, the daughter of Benjamin Pierce, and the sister of Benjamin Kendrick Pierce and Franklin Pierce.  Because of the family connection to Franklin Pierce, who was president during Wentworth's House term, Wentworth was able to maintain cordial relations with Democrats despite disagreeing with them politically.  As a result, he was sometimes employed by Whigs as a negotiator to create compromises with congressional Democrats and the Pierce administration.

References

Tappan Wentworth in History of Middlesex County, Massachusetts.  Volume 1.  1890.  D. Hamilton Hurd, author.

External links

 
 

1802 births
1875 deaths
Whig Party members of the United States House of Representatives from Massachusetts
Members of the Massachusetts House of Representatives
Massachusetts state senators
Massachusetts lawyers
Burials in Massachusetts
19th-century American politicians
19th-century American lawyers